Gordana Kuić (29 August 1942 – January 2023) was a Serbian novelist.

Biography
Kuić was born on 29 August 1942. She was the winner of numerous literature awards in the countries that made up former Yugoslavia. Her work has been mainly inspired by her mother Blanka Levi and her aunts, such as Laura Papo Bohoreta, to whom she dedicated two novels, who were Sephardi Jews. Kuić is probably best known for her first novel The Scent of Rain in the Balkans, an unexpected hit initially published by the Jewish community imprint in Belgrade in 1986. The book was subsequently made into a ballet, a theatre play and television series.

Kuić died in January 2023, at the age of 80.

Bibliography

Novels

 The Scent of Rain in the Balkans (Miris kiše na Balkanu)
 The Blossom of Linden in the Balkans (Cvat lipe na Balkanu)
 Twilight in the Balkans (Smiraj dana na Balkanu)
 Ghosts over the Balkans (Duhovi nad Balkanom)
 The Legend of Luna Levi (Legenda o Luni Levi)
 The Fairytale of Benjamin Baruh (Bajka o Benjaminu Baruhu)
 The Ballad of Bohoreta (Balada o Bohoreti)

Other work

 Remnants (Preostale priče) — stories
 On the Other Side of the Night (S druge strane noći) - stories

References

External links
 Official Website

1942 births
2023 deaths
Writers from Belgrade
21st-century Sephardi Jews
Serbian Sephardi Jews
Serbian novelists
Jewish women writers
Serbian women novelists
Serbian people of Spanish descent
Serbian people of Bosnia and Herzegovina descent